2009 in cycle racing may refer to:

 2009 in men's road cycling
 2009 in women's road cycling
 2008–09 in men's cyclo-cross

See also
 2009 in sports